Detroit-New York Junction is an album by American jazz trumpeter Thad Jones featuring performances recorded in 1956 and released on the Blue Note label. The recording session was one of Tommy Flanagan's first recording sessions after he moved to New York City in 1956, and came one day after the pianist played with the same rhythm section for a Blue Note session led by Kenny Burrell.

Reception
The Allmusic review by Stephen Thomas Erlewine awarded the album 4 stars calling it "an excellent set of driving hard bop".

Track listing
All compositions by Thad Jones except as indicated
 "Blue Room" (Lorenz Hart, Richard Rodgers) - 6:48
 "Tariff"- 5:32
 "Little Girl Blue" (Hart, Rodgers) - 2:52
 "Scratch" - 10:32
 "Zec" - 8:46
Recorded at Audio-Video Studios in New York City on March 13, 1956

Personnel
Thad Jones - trumpet
Billy Mitchell - tenor saxophone (tracks 1, 2, 4 & 5)
Tommy Flanagan - piano (tracks 1, 2,4 & 5)
Kenny Burrell - guitar
Oscar Pettiford - bass
Shadow Wilson - drums (tracks 1, 2, 4 & 5)

References 

Blue Note Records albums
Thad Jones albums
1956 albums
Albums produced by Alfred Lion